Kenneth Eriksson (born 13 May 1956 in Äppelbo, in the kommun of Vansbro) is a now retired World Rally Championship rally driver. He drove for several manufacturer teams, including the Subaru World Rally Team, Mitsubishi, Hyundai and Škoda. He was the 1986 Group A Champion in the competition's only year, his best performance, overshadowed by the fatalities that occurred in that season.

His finest showing in the top-tier World Rally Championship was third place overall for Mitsubishi in 1995. He controversially won the Swedish Rally that year under pressure on the road from second-placed young teammate Tommi Mäkinen, as well as winning directly ahead of the Champion-elect, Subaru World Rally Team's Colin McRae in Australia. He then switched to Subaru for the 1996 season to drive the Impreza WRC alongside McRae. He excelled for them as a second points-scorer on the championship's loose-surface rounds. Conversely, Italian Piero Liatti often took on the same responsibility for asphalt rounds. By the end of the 1997 season Eriksson and regular co-driver Staffan Parmander had collected six individual World Rally victories. These included a famous win aboard the Impreza in New Zealand in 1997, on which occasion he took advantage of the altercation with a sheep that befell long-time leader, Ford's Carlos Sainz.  Between 1995 and 1997, he also notched up a hat-trick of Asia-Pacific rally titles.

After finishing fourth on the 1998 Swedish Rally, Eriksson was released from his contract at Subaru in order to pursue a kit-car and latterly a World Rally Car chance with Hyundai. He was joined as factory driver of both the Hyundai Coupe and eventual Hyundai Accent WRC by fellow eventual one-time Subaru driver, Alister McRae. 6th on the 2001 Rally Great Britain marked his solitary points finish for the team, on his last outing with them. He then enjoyed his final season with Škoda, in 2002, alongside female navigator Tina Thörner in the light of Parmander's retirement and with his teammate in the sister Octavia WRC being the young Finn Toni Gardemeister.

Eriksson departed the 'works' world rally scene at the end of 2002. He has since been competing in the Race to the Sky hillclimb event held in Cardrona Valley, New Zealand. He finished second in 2005, 2006 and 2007.

WRC victories

WRC results

References

External links

Kenneth Eriksson at ewrc-results

World Rally Championship drivers
Swedish rally drivers
Living people
1956 births
Toyota Gazoo Racing drivers
Hyundai Motorsport drivers
Volkswagen Motorsport drivers
Škoda Motorsport drivers